Rainbow Over Broadway is a 1933 American pre-Code
musical drama film directed by Richard Thorpe and starring Joan Marsh, Frank Albertson and Lucien Littlefield. The film's sets were designed by the art director Edward C. Jewell.

Cast
 Joan Marsh as Judy Chibbins  
 Frank Albertson as Don Hayes  
 Lucien Littlefield as Timothy Chibbins  
 Grace Hayes as Trixie Valleron  
 Gladys Blake as Nellie Valleron  
 Glen Boles as Mickey Chibbins  
 Dell Henderson as Bowers  
 Nat Carr as Sanfield  
 Harry Myers as Berwiskey  
 May Beatty as Queenie  
 George Grandee as Bob  
 Aline Goodwin as Chorus Girl  
 Maxine Lewis as Chorus Girl

References

Bibliography
 Bradley, Edwin M. Unsung Hollywood Musicals of the Golden Era: 50 Overlooked Films and Their Stars, 1929-1939. McFarland, 2016.

External links
 
 

1933 films
1930s musical drama films
1930s English-language films
American musical drama films
Films directed by Richard Thorpe
American black-and-white films
Chesterfield Pictures films
Films set in New York City
1933 drama films
1930s American films